The ministries of Turkey are the most influential part of the executive branch of the Turkish government. Each ministry is headed by a minister appointed by the President. Currently there are 17 ministries.

List of ministries

History

Former ministries 

 Ministry of General Staff (1923–24): Became General Staff of the Republic of Turkey
 Ministry of Sharia and the Foundations (1923–1924): Became Presidency of Religious Affairs
 Ministry of Construction and Settlement (1923–1925)
 Ministry of Navy (1924–1927): Merged with Ministry of National Defence
 Ministry of Enterprises (1978–1979)
 Ministry of Coordination (1957–1960)
 Ministry of Local Governments (1978–1979)
 Ministry of European Union Affairs (2011–2018)
 Ministry of Development (2011–2018)
 Ministry of Economy (2011–2018): Merged with Ministry of Trade

List of ministers
 List of Ministers of Finance of Turkey
 List of Ministers of Foreign Affairs of Turkey
 List of Ministers of Culture and Tourism of Turkey
 List of Ministers of National Defense of Turkey
 List of Ministers of National Education of Turkey
 List of Ministers of the Interior of Turkey
 List of Ministers of Justice of Turkey
 List of Ministers of Transport and Infrastructure of Turkey

Former:
 List of prime ministers of Turkey
 List of deputy prime ministers of Turkey

See also 
 Government of Turkey
 Cabinet of Turkey (list)
Ministries of the Ottoman Empire

References

External links 
 The President's Office

Government of Turkey